Josh Price (born 19 December 1998 in Hemel Hempstead) Currently competing for Team TF Sport driving an Aston Martin Vantage GT4, placing 16th in his first race and ending the season with 44.5 points good for 12th in the series.

Racing career

Early career

Price began his car racing career in 2015, joining the Renault UK Clio Cup with Team Pyro for six races. He remained with the team for the full season for 2016, eventually finishing 6th in points after taking his first win in the final race.

British Touring Car Championship
Price initially resigned for another season of the Clio Cup with Team Pyro, this time as part of Team BMR's academy. However, at the BTCC Media Day on 16 March, Price was announced as Team BMR's fourth BTCC driver running one of their Subaru Levorgs. His teammates were Jason Plato, Ashley Sutton and James Cole.

British GT Championship
Price was partnered with Patrick Kibble and drove for the TF Sport team run by ex-BTCC driver Tom Ferrier. Price and Kibble only had three points-scoring races, one of which was a third place finish at Spa-Francorchamps.

Racing record

Complete British Touring Car Championship results

(key) (Races in bold indicate pole position – 1 point awarded just in first race; races in italics indicate fastest lap – 1 point awarded all races; * signifies that driver led race for at least one lap – 1 point given all races)

Complete British GT Championship results
(key) (Races in bold indicate pole position) (Races in italics indicate fastest lap)

References

1998 births
Living people
Sportspeople from Hemel Hempstead
English racing drivers
British Touring Car Championship drivers
Renault UK Clio Cup drivers